Bbaale is a town in the Kayunga District in Uganda. It is the location of the headquarters of Bbaale County. The correct phonetic spelling is with two "b"s and two "a"s, although literature exists in which it is spelled Bale.

Location
The coordinates of Bbaale are:1°05'51.0"N, 32°53'12.0"E (Latitude:1.097500; Longitude:32.886667).

Overview
Bbaale is on the western banks of the Victoria Nile. It is the location of the headquarters of Bbaale County, one of the two counties that constitute Kayunga District, the other being Ntenjeru County.

Points of interest
The following points of interest lie within Bbaale or near its borders:

 The headquarters of Bbaale County - one of the two counties that constitute Kayunga District, the other being Ntenjeru County
 The offices of Bbaale Town Council
 Bbaale Central Market - the largest fresh-produce market in the town
 Kayunga–Galiraya Road - The road passes through town in a south to north direction.

See also
 Ntenjeru
 List of cities and towns in Uganda

References

External links
 Webpage of Kayunga District

Kayunga District
Populated places in Uganda
Cities in the Great Rift Valley